In Christian theology, a heresiarch (also hæresiarch, according to the Oxford English Dictionary; from Greek: , hairesiárkhēs via the late Latin haeresiarcha) or arch-heretic is an originator of heretical doctrine or the founder of a sect that sustains such a doctrine.

Examples

 Marcion, the founder of Marcionism 
 Arius, the founder of Arianism
 St. Augustine refers to Mani, the founder of Manichaeism, as a heresiarch. 
 Menocchio, an Italian miller who was burned at the stake in 1599
 Catholics, especially traditionalist Catholics such as Hilaire Belloc, consider Martin Luther, John Calvin, and other leaders of the Protestant Reformation to be arch-heretics.
 Conversely, some fundamentalist Protestants (including Alexander Hislop and Charles Chiniquy) have used the term to refer to the papacy and the members of the Roman Curia.
 Martin of Armenia, the fictional founder of the Old Russian Rite used by the Old Believers

Dante's Inferno

In his Divine Comedy, Dante Alighieri represents the heresiarchs as being immured in tombs of fire in the Sixth Circle of Hell.  In Cantos IX and X of the Inferno, Virgil describes the suffering these souls experience, saying "Here are the Arch-Heretics, surrounded by every sect their followers... / Like with like is buried, and the monuments are different in degrees of heat." Among the historical figures that Dante specifically lists as arch-heretics are Epicurus, Farinata Degli Uberti, Frederick I of Sicily, and Pope Anastasius II.

See also

List of Christian heresies
Heresy in Christianity

References

 Catholic Encyclopedia

Heresy in Christianity